Bennie Hofs, also known as Ben Hofs (2 November 1946 – 4 June 2017) was a Dutch professional footballer who spent his entire career with Vitesse. He played as a midfielder.

References

1946 births
2017 deaths
Footballers from Arnhem
Dutch footballers
Association football midfielders
SBV Vitesse players
Eerste Divisie players
Eredivisie players
Deaths from blood disease